Nonzeville is a commune in the Vosges department in Grand Est in northeastern France.

Inhabitants are called Nonzevillois.

Geography
Nonzeville is the smallest commune by area in the départment. The commune contains the source of a spring called the Soie which joins up with the Arentèle in the neighbouring commune of Pierrepont.

History
The earliest surviving record of the village dates from the tenth century when it was named as Nuntiavilla, which might be translated from Latin as the foretelling town or the town of the annunciation (ville annonciatrice).

Later versions of the name that turn up include Lonzéville or indeed Nonzéville.   Long before the French Revolution the village was part of the Vaudicourt territory (ban de Vaudicourt), owned by the Abbey of Remiremont.   The main street indeed continued to be called the Rue du ban de Vaudicourt until the nineteenth century.

Population probably peaked in the middle of the sixteenth century, when an estimate based on the number of homesteads implies a population of 193.   However, by the end of the Thirty Years War it had declined to an estimated level of just 29 in 1648 thanks, presumably, to the triple war induced evils of that time, massacres, famine and plague.   The village population never recovered during the ancien regime period.   The population returned to 195 registered at the time of the 1831 census, but thereafter the pattern of population decline has mirrored the experience of many Lorraine villages, as commercial opportunities, factory wages and overseas emigration attracted villagers of working age away from the countryside, a trend exacerbated by the decline in farm incomes that followed the agricultural depression of the 1870s.

The commune does not have its own church.   For church matters it depends on the parish of Saint Rémi down the hill at Destord.

See also
Communes of the Vosges department

References

Communes of Vosges (department)